Otakar "Ota" Kroutil (born 31 December 1921 in Dobřichovice) was a Czechoslovak sprint canoer who competed in the late 1940s and early 1950s. He won a bronze medal in the K-4 1000 m event at the 1948 ICF Canoe Sprint World Championships in London.

Kroutil also competed in two Summer Olympics, earning his best finish of fifth in the K-2 1000 m event at London in 1948.

References

Sports-reference.com profile

External links
 

1921 births
Canoeists at the 1948 Summer Olympics
Canoeists at the 1952 Summer Olympics
Czechoslovak male canoeists
Olympic canoeists of Czechoslovakia
Possibly living people
ICF Canoe Sprint World Championships medalists in kayak
People from Prague-West District